WOW for the Children includes twelve songs on a single CD. The tracks are a mix of top gospel, CCM and CWM songs. It was compiled especially for the charitable organization Feed the Children. The album was not available commercially but was only given as a gift to donors.

Track listing

Crazy Times - Jars of Clay
Revive Us (urban mix) - Anointed
Can't Live A Day - Avalon
Jesus, Lover Of My Soul - Darlene Zschech
Butterfly Kisses - Bob Carlisle
I Could Sing Of Your Love Forever - Delirious?
Jesus Is All (Remix) - Fred Hammond & Radical For Christ
Show You Love - Jaci Velasquez
The Great Adventure - Steven Curtis Chapman
A Little More - Jennifer Knapp
Come, Now Is The Time To Worship - Vineyard
Never Seen The Righteous - Donald Lawrence & The Tri-City Singers

References

External links 
 Feed The Children official site

WOW series albums
2000 compilation albums